Donald Nelsen (born September 4, 1944) is a former American cyclist. He competed in the team pursuit at the 1964 Summer Olympics.

References

1944 births
Living people
American male cyclists
Olympic cyclists of the United States
Cyclists at the 1964 Summer Olympics
American track cyclists